Enlisted may refer to:

 Enlisted rank, any rank below that of a commissioned officer
 Enlisted (TV series), a 2014 television series
 Enlisted (video game), a 2021 massively multiplayer online game first-person shooter video game